Elena Likhovtseva was the defending champion but lost in the second round to Maria Vento.

Ai Sugiyama won in the final 7–5, 6–0 against Vento.

Seeds
A champion seed is indicated in bold text while text in italics indicates the round in which that seed was eliminated. The top two seeds received a bye to the second round.

  Brenda Schultz-McCarthy (quarterfinals)
  Ruxandra Dragomir (quarterfinals)
 n/a
  Ai Sugiyama (champion)
  Patty Schnyder (second round)
  Joannette Kruger (first round)
  Elena Likhovtseva (second round)
  Anne-Gaëlle Sidot (first round)

Draw

Final

Section 1

Section 2

External links
 1998 Thalgo Australian Women's Hardcourts draw

Sin